Mideidae is a family of mites belonging to the order Trombidiformes.

Genera
 Eumidea Tuzovskij, 1982
 Midea Bruzelius, 1854

References

Trombidiformes